Ken Bray is an Australian rugby league footballer who played in the 1950s and 1960s.  He played for Western Suburbs and  Balmain in the New South Wales Rugby League (NSWRL) competition.

Background
Bray was a Balmain junior and played for Drummoyne before being graded by Balmain.  Bray then went on to win the third grade premiership and reserve grade premierships with Balmain.

Playing career
Bray made his first grade debut for Balmain against Western Suburbs at Pratten Park in 1957 as a replacement for the injured Keith Barnes.  Bray made one further first grade appearance for Balmain but spent the majority of his time in reserve grade.  In his final season at Balmain, Bray won the reserve grade premiership at the club.

In 1960, Bray joined Western Suburbs and mainly played reserve grade in his first season as Darcy Russell was the first choice fullback at the club.  In 1961, Bray only made 1 appearance for Wests as he suffered a serious knee injury against Newtown in the opening round.

In 1962, Western Suburbs reached their second straight grand final and Bray was called into the grand final team after fullback Don Parish was ruled out injured.  Wests went on to lose the grand final 9–6 with Bray kicking 3 goals in a defeated side.  In 1964, Wests missed the finals series but Bray did finish the club's top point scorer with 131 points.  In his final 2 seasons at Wests, Bray missed the majority of games due to recurring injuries and he retired at the end of 1966.

References

1937 births
Living people
Western Suburbs Magpies players
Balmain Tigers players
Australian rugby league players
Rugby league players from Sydney
Rugby league wingers
Rugby league fullbacks